Spain competed at the modern Olympic Games for the first time at the 1900 Summer Olympics in Paris, France.

Medalists
Gold medals were not given at the 1900 Games.  A silver medal was given for first place, and a bronze medal was given for second.  The International Olympic Committee has retroactively assigned gold, silver, and bronze medals to competitors who earned 1st, 2nd, and 3rd-place finishes, respectively, in order to bring early Olympics in line with current awards.

Pedro Pidal, 1st Marquess of Villaviciosa de Asturias got a silver medal in live pingeon shooting, but this event is not recognized by CIO as an official event as the winner was given a money award. Nevertheless, the Spanish Olympic Committee does recognize the medal.

Gold
 José de Amézola y Aspizúa and Francisco Villota — Basque pelota

Results by event

Basque pelota

Spain's first Olympic appearance included a two-man team in pelota. There were only two teams registered for the tournament, however the French duo were unable to attend the game. The French team thus lost by forfeit, and Spain won the gold medal.

Equestrian

Spain had one equestrian compete in 1900; his place in the mail coach event is unknown except that he was not in the top 4.

Fencing

Spain appeared in fencing in the nation's debut appearance.

Rowing

Spain sent a coxed fours boat and a single sculler to compete in the rowing events.

References

External links
Spanish Olympic Committee

Nations at the 1900 Summer Olympics
1900
Olympics